Steve Loic Solvet (born 20 March 1996) is a Guadeloupean professional footballer who plays as a centre-back for French  club Orléans, and the Guadeloupe national team.

Career
Solvet began playing football in his native Guadeloupe with his local club Intrépide de Saint Anne, and passed through the youth academies of Creps Antilles-Guyane and Bischheim in France. He began his senior career with the reserve sides of Strasbourg and Dijon, signing a professional contract with the former. In 2019, he had a stint with Bergerac, before joining Sète in the Championnat National in the summer of 2020.

In June 2022, Solvet agreed to sign with Orléans.

International career
Solvet debuted with the Guadeloupe national team in a 2–1 friendly win over Martinique on 23 June 2021. He was called up to represent Guadeloupe at the 2021 CONCACAF Gold Cup.

References

External links
 
 

1996 births
Living people
People from Les Abymes
Guadeloupean footballers
Guadeloupe international footballers
RC Strasbourg Alsace players
Dijon FCO players
FC Sète 34 players
US Orléans players
Championnat National players
Championnat National 2 players
Championnat National 3 players
Association football defenders
2021 CONCACAF Gold Cup players